2436 Hatshepsut , provisional designation , is a Hygiean asteroid from the outer asteroid belt, approximately 19 kilometers in diameter. It was discovered by Cornelis van Houten, Ingrid van Houten-Groeneveld and Tom Gehrels at Palomar Observatory on 24 September 1960. It was named for pharaoh Hatshepsut.

Orbit and characterization 

Hatshepsut is a member of the Hygiea family, a very large family of carbonaceous outer-belt asteroids, named after the fourth-largest asteroid, 10 Hygiea. It orbits the Sun in the outer main-belt at a distance of 2.9–3.5 AU once every 5 years and 8 months (2,072 days). Its orbit has an eccentricity of 0.10 and an inclination of 4° with respect to the ecliptic. Its orbit is only slightly eccentric and not much inclined to the ecliptic. The asteroid rotates around its axis every 9 hours.

Survey designation 

The survey designation "P-L" stands for Palomar–Leiden, named after Palomar Observatory and Leiden Observatory, which collaborated on the fruitful Palomar–Leiden survey in the 1960s. Gehrels used Palomar's Samuel Oschin telescope (also known as the 48-inch Schmidt Telescope), and shipped the photographic plates to Ingrid and Cornelis van Houten at Leiden Observatory where astrometry was carried out. The trio are credited with the discovery of several thousand asteroid discoveries.

Naming 

This minor planet named after the only female pharaoh to reign over ancient Egypt, Hatshepsut. The approved naming citation was published on 22 September 1983.

References

External links 
 Asteroid Lightcurve Database (LCDB), query form (info )
 Dictionary of Minor Planet Names, Google books
 Asteroids and comets rotation curves, CdR – Observatoire de Genève, Raoul Behrend
 Discovery Circumstances: Numbered Minor Planets (1)-(5000) – Minor Planet Center
 
 

002436
6066
Discoveries by Cornelis Johannes van Houten
Discoveries by Ingrid van Houten-Groeneveld
Discoveries by Tom Gehrels
Named minor planets
19600924